Goudy may refer to:

 Frederic Goudy (1865–1947), American type designer
 Todd Goudy, Canadian provincial politician
 William C. Goudy (1824–1893), American politician
 Yann Goudy (born 1975), French racing driver 
 Goudy Old Style, a type face created by Frederic Goudy

See also
 Goudie, a surname